The Con Creek School, in Mendocino County, California near Boonville, California, was built in 1877.  The school and another contributing building were listed on the National Register of Historic Places in 1979.

Also known as the Little Red Schoolhouse, the Con Creek School is a schoolhouse built in the Greek Revival style by J.D. Ball in 1891. Used as a classroom for eight grade levels for 50 years, it was trimmed down to only 7th and 8th grades by 1941.  In 1958 its use changed again to that of a kindergarten, and remained so until 1979, when it was donated to the local historical society.  The Little Red Schoolhouse is located near the community of Boonville

References

One-room schoolhouses in California
Schools in California
School buildings on the National Register of Historic Places in California
National Register of Historic Places in Mendocino County, California
Greek Revival architecture in California
Buildings and structures completed in 1877
1877 establishments in California